John Frederick Bissinger Jr. (January 7, 1879 in New York, New York – January 20, 1941 in Bronx, New York) was an American gymnast and track and field athlete who competed in the 1904 Summer Olympics.

In 1904, Bissinger won the silver medal in the team event. He was also fifth in the athletics' triathlon event, eights in the gymnastics all-around event and 14th in the gymnastics' triathlon event.

References

External links
 
 profile 

1879 births
1941 deaths
American male artistic gymnasts
Olympic track and field athletes of the United States
Gymnasts at the 1904 Summer Olympics
Athletes (track and field) at the 1904 Summer Olympics
Olympic silver medalists for the United States in gymnastics
Medalists at the 1904 Summer Olympics
Track and field athletes from New York City